Mike Bannister (born May 1949) is an airline pilot. He is most famous as the Chief Pilot of British Airways' Concorde fleet, a post which he held from 1995 until its withdrawal from service in 2003.

Education 
Bannister graduated from the Ashton School, Dunstable, and the College of Air Training Hamble, having been awarded a Royal Air Force Flying Scholarship in 1966.

Career 
Bannister joined BOAC (British Airways’ predecessor) in 1969 as a pilot and flight navigator on the Vickers VC10 fleet. He joined the British Airways crew of Concorde in 1977 where he became its youngest pilot. In his Concorde career Bannister accumulated around 9,600 Concorde flight hours, almost 7,000 of which were supersonic. Bannister captained Concorde's retirement flight from New York to London on 24 October 2003. 

Since the retirement of Concorde, Bannister has contributed significantly to the raising of over £350,000 for good causes by lectures, signings and personal contributions etc.  Wishing to "Put Something Back" he is very active in the Voluntary/Third Sector, including taking on roles as a Chair of School Governors of an Independent School in Surrey, Corporate Non Executive Directorships, Anglican Church Lay PCC Chair and as a Trustee of a number of organisations, including Brooklands Museum, where he has recently been interim Chairman during an internal reorganisation.

He currently works for an Aviation Consultancy specialising in Airline Management, Operational, Safety and Security matters across a wide range of aircraft types and geographical locations. 

He released a book “Concorde” in 2022 in which he writes about his flying experiences especially his flying career on Concorde.

References

1949 births
Living people
British aviators
Concorde pilots